The 2021 Joe McDonagh Cup was the fourth staging of the Joe McDonagh Cup since its establishment by the Gaelic Athletic Association in 2018. The competition, which was delayed for a second successive year due to the impact of the COVID-19 pandemic on Gaelic games, began on 26 June 2021. The fixtures were published on 21 April 2021.

Antrim, winner of the 2020 final, were promoted to the Leinster Senior Hurling Championship, while there was no relegation to or from the competition. Down and Kildare entered the competition from the Christy Ring Cup.

On 17 July 2021, Westmeath won the Joe McDonagh Cup after a 2-28 to 1-24 win over Kerry in the final at Croke Park. It was their first ever cup title having previously lost two finals.

Meath's Jack Regan was the championship's top scorer with 1-36.

Team changes

To Championship 
Relegated from the All-Ireland Senior Hurling Championship

 None

Promoted from the Christy Ring Cup

 Down
 Kildare

From Championship 
Promoted to the All-Ireland Senior Hurling Championship

 Antrim

Relegated to the Christy Ring Cup

 None

Teams

Personnel and general information

Group stage

Group A

Group A round 1

Group A round 2

Group A round 3

Group B

Group B round 1

Group B round 2

Group B round 3

Knockout stage

Final
Westmeath are promoted to the 2022 All-Ireland Senior Hurling Championship.

Relegation Playoff 

Kildare are relegated to the 2022 Christy Ring Cup.

Statistics

Top scorers

Top scorer overall

In a single game

Scoring Events 

 Widest winning margin: 10 points
 Kildare 1-15 - 0-28 Meath (Relegation Playoff)
 Most goals in a match: 5
 Kildare 3-16 - 2-22 Carlow (Round 1A)
 Most points in a match: 52
 Westmeath 2-28 - 1-24 Kerry (Final)
 Most goals by one team in a match: 3
 Kildare 3-16 - 2-22 Carlow (Round 1A)
 Most points by one team in a match: 28
 Meath 0-28 - 1-21 Kerry (Round 3B)
 Westmeath 2-28 - 1-24 Kerry (Final)
 Kildare 1-15 - 0-28 Meath (Relegation Playoff)
 Highest aggregate score: 61 points
 Westmeath 2-28 - 1-24 Kerry (Final)
 Lowest aggregate score: 41 points
 Carlow 0-18 - 0-23 Westmeath (Round 1B)

Miscellaneous

 Westmeath's Davey Glennon became the first player to win both Joe McDonagh Cup and All-Ireland Championship winners' medals, having claimed the latter with Galway in 2017.
 Westmeath won their 1st championship in 11 years since winning the 2010 Christy Ring Cup.
 Down become only the second ever Ulster team to compete in the Joe McDonagh Cup.
 First-time Joe McDonagh Cup meetings:
 Kildare v Carlow (Round 1)
 Kerry v Down (Round 2)
 Down v Meath (Round 3)
 Westmeath v Kildare (Round 3)
 Kildare v Meath (Relegation Playoff)

References 

Joe McDonagh Cup
Joe McDonagh Cup
Joe McDonagh Cup